Propiomarengo plana is a species of jumping spider in the genus Propiomarengo that lives in South Africa. Originally named Afromarengo plana when first described in 2013, the species was renamed 7 years later and made the type species of the new genus. Only the female has been described, which has a distinctive epigyne with two depressions flanking a ridge. It has only been found in Free State.

Taxonomy and etymology
First described by Charles Haddad and Wanda Wesołowska in 2013, the spider was allocated to the genus Afromarengo. The genus name derived from the root Afro, meaning from Africa, and the genus name Marengo. It was the third species to be added to the genus. In 2020, the species was transferred to the new genus Propiomarengo by Galina Azarkina working with Charles Haddad. The name has a similar construction, once again recalling Marengo, but with a prefix recalling the Latin word for similar, propior. It was made the type species of the genus. The species name is derived from the Latin word for flat.

Description
Only the female has been described. It is small, with a brown carapace and a grey-beige oval abdomen that is covered in small brown hairs. The epigyne is distinctive and has a narrow ridge that is flanked by two large depressions shaped like beans. It differs from other members of the genus in the shape of the carapace, which is more rounded when viewed from the side.

Distribution and habitat
The spider has only been found in South Africa and has a limited range. The holotype was found at the Tussen-die-Riviere Nature Reserve in Free State. It was first seen near to the river, in bushes on the edge of grassland.  It has also been seen in nearby farmland.

References

Citations

Bibliography

Endemic fauna of South Africa
Salticidae
Spiders described in 2013
Spiders of South Africa
Taxa named by Wanda Wesołowska